The 1947 Northwestern Wildcats team was an American football team that represented Northwestern University during the 1947 Big Nine Conference football season. In its first year under head coach Bob Voigts, the team compiled a 3–6 record (2–4 against Big Nine Conference opponents),finished in eighth place in the Big Ten Conference, and outscored opponents by a total of 197 to 129.

No Northwestern players were named to the 1947 All-Big Nine Conference football teams.

Schedule

References

Northwestern
Northwestern Wildcats football seasons
Northwestern Wildcats football